Harugumi Mutasa is a Zimbabwean broadcast journalist. She currently a journalist for Al Jazeera

Career
Early Career
Mutasa began her career working for: the South African Broadcasting Corporation (SABC), CNN, Television New Zealand (TVNZ), Associated Press Television News (APTN) and the STAR Sports network.

As a reporter based in Harare, Zimbabwe, Mutasa produced stories about her country for: CNN's Inside Africa, Television New Zealand (TVNZ) and APTN.  She was once denied a visa by the United Kingdom because they assumed that there was no guarantee that she would return to Zimbabwe. She has been under the spotlight for challenging the Western Media pertaining their reportage of Africa particularly Zimbabwe. Mutasa underscored that Euporeans do not like to be challenged, in that regard, she urged media practitioners in Zimbabwe to deliberate and establish why Western countries promote such narratives.

Al Jazeera English
She is a field-correspondent for the Southern Africa region, based in Johannesburg, in South Africa. Previously, she worked in East Africa, based at the bureau in Nairobi. In addition to these regions, Mutasa has covered stories from across Africa.

Although known mainly as a news correspondent, Mutasa also hosts studio-based interview-programmes. In 2013, she hosted the One World Summit show where pertinent issues around leadership were issues around millennial leadership were discussed, she was alongside Pakistani author and political commentator, Fatima Bhutto.

Awards
 2007: Royal Television Society Awards: a nominee for the "Young Journalist of the Year" award.

References

External links
 Haru Mutasa  Al Jazeera English (04/02/17)

Living people
Alumni of Dominican Convent High School
Rhodes University alumni
Zimbabwean journalists
Zimbabwean women journalists
CNN people
Associated Press reporters
Al Jazeera people
21st-century Zimbabwean writers
Year of birth missing (living people)